Stonewater may refer to:
Stonewater (housing association)
Stonewater Golf Course